Andrew Clive Sayer (born 6 June 1966) is an English former professional footballer who played in the Football League as a forward.

References

1966 births
Living people
English footballers
Association football forwards
Wimbledon F.C. players
Vasalunds IF players
Cambridge United F.C. players
Fulham F.C. players
Leyton Orient F.C. players
Sheffield United F.C. players
Slough Town F.C. players
Enfield F.C. players
Walton & Hersham F.C. players
Leatherhead F.C. players
Tooting & Mitcham United F.C. players
Molesey F.C. players
Egham Town F.C. players
English Football League players
National League (English football) players